Miltonduff distillery is a Scotch whisky distillery located in Miltonduff six miles south-west of Elgin in the whisky region of Speyside.

History
The distillery site 'Milton' was said to have been chosen because of the good quality of the local water source under the ownership of Pluscarden Abbey; indeed, the distillery is the site of the Abbey's former mill. Milton became Miltonduff after the Duff family acquired the area and a distillery was built in 1824. In 1866, the distillery was acquired by William Stuart (owner of the Highland Park Distillery and he eventually entered into business with Thomas Yool in 1890, when the distillery was expanded and reached production of over one million litres of alcohol. 

In 1936, Yool sold the distillery to Hiram Walker, which eventually passed in ownership to Allied Distillers. The distillery site was expanded with the construction of Allied Distillers' Malt Technical Centre, laboratory, engineering department and management offices. In 1960, the distillery was notable as the pioneer of a new method of heating the wash stills (through a series of heat exchanges and a diffuser).

In 2005, Pernod Ricard bought the distillery and it is now operated under their subsidiary Chivas Brothers. 

In May 2022, Chivas Brothers announced that £88 million would be invested in the expansion of the distillery (together with Aberlour distillery). This is to include newer energy efficient production methods, incorporating Mechanical Vapour Recompression (MVR) fan technology. The new sustainable distillery is to be built adjacent to the current distillery by 2025.

Facilities

The distillery has six stills and several warehouses for storage.

Products
The distillery has been a key production component of Ballantyne's blended whisky since 1936.
While much of the production of Miltonduff is used in blends, the distillery has produced a single malt since 1964 named 'Mosstowie'.

References

Distilleries in Scotland
Scottish malt whisky